It Always Will Be is the 52nd studio album by country singer Willie Nelson. It includes a cover of the Allman Brothers Band's "Midnight Rider," recorded here as a duet with Toby Keith. The cover was released as a single, but did not chart.

Track listing

All songs written by Willie Nelson, except where noted.

"It Always Will Be" – 4:11
"Picture in a Frame" (Tom Waits, Kathleen Brennan) – 3:39
"The Way You See Me" (Rusty Adams, Jimmy Day) – 4:21
"Be That As It May" (Paula Nelson) (Duet with Paula Nelson) – 3:29
"You Were It" – 4:28
"Big Booty" (Sonny Throckmorton)– 3:03
"I Didn't Come Here (And I Ain't Leavin')" (Scotty Emerick, Michael Smotherman) – 3:10
"My Broken Heart Belongs to You" (David Anderson, Willie Nelson) – 2:26
"Dreams Come True" (J.C. Hopkins) (Duet with Norah Jones)– 4:35
"Over Time" (Lucinda Williams) (Duet with Lucinda Williams) – 3:45
"Tired" (Chuck Cannon, Toby Keith) – 4:19
"Love's the One and Only Thing" (Scotty Emerick, Dave Loggins) – 3:34
"Texas" – 3:55
"Midnight Rider" (Gregg Allman, Richard Payne) (Duet with Toby Keith) – 3:00

Personnel
Willie Nelson - guitar, acoustic guitar, vocals
Eddie Bayers - drums
Dan Dugmore - pedal steel
Chris Dunn - horn
Scotty Emerick - acoustic guitar
Shannon Forrest - drums
Paul Franklin - pedal steel
Kenny Greenberg - electric guitar
Wes Hightower - vocals
Jim Horn - horn
Clayton Ivey - piano, keyboards
Amy James - vocals
Sam Levine - horn
Liana Manis - vocals
Brent Mason - electric guitar
Steve Nathan - piano, keyboards
Steve Patrick - horn
Mickey Raphael - harmonica
Michael Rhodes - bass guitar
Matt Rollings - piano, keyboards
Biff Watson - acoustic guitar
Glenn Worf - bass guitar

Chart performance

References

2004 albums
Willie Nelson albums
Albums produced by James Stroud
Lost Highway Records albums